José Guillermo Herrera Mendoza (born 16 June 1960) is a Mexican politician affiliated with the Convergence. As of 2014 he served as Senator of the LIX Legislature of the Mexican Congress representing Veracruz as replacement of Armando Méndez de la Luz.

References

1960 births
Living people
Politicians from Veracruz
Members of the Senate of the Republic (Mexico)
Citizens' Movement (Mexico) politicians
21st-century Mexican politicians
Universidad Veracruzana alumni